Mamadou Cisse (born June 2, 1986 in Fria) is a Guinean swimmer. He competed in the men's 50 metre freestyle at the 2008 Summer Olympics, finishing 89th.

External links
Sports Reference

Living people
Swimmers at the 2008 Summer Olympics
Olympic swimmers of Guinea
Guinean male swimmers
1986 births
People from Fria
21st-century Guinean people